Chimoio Airport  is an airport in Chimoio, Mozambique.

Airlines and destinations

References

OurAirports - Chimoio

Airports in Mozambique
Buildings and structures in Manica Province